Gizem Giraygil (born May 8, 1986 in Ankara) is a Turkish volleyball player. Currently, Gizem competes for Lokomotiv Baku in Azerbaijan. She played 59 times for the Turkish national team.

Personal life
Gizem Giraygil was born to Ömer Giraygil in Ankara on May 8, 1986. She spent her early years in a sport environment due to her father's post as the manager of the Selim Sırrı Tarcan Sport Hall. Supported by her parents, she began with volleyball playing at the age of eleven.

She was educated in Political Science at Çankaya University in Ankara.

Playing career
After playing for Vakıfbank Güneş Sigorta, İller Bankası, Toki, Fenerbahçe and Ereğli Belediye, she transferred to Ankaragücü.

End January 2012, she left Ankaragücü, however, due to the club's financial problems, and signed for Beşiktaş in Istanbul. In August 2012, she transferred to the Izmir-based club Karşıyaka. In July 2013, she moved to the Azeri club Lokomotiv Baku.

See also 
 Turkish women in sports

References

External links
 
 
 

1986 births
Sportspeople from Ankara
Çankaya University alumni
Turkish women's volleyball players
Fenerbahçe volleyballers
VakıfBank S.K. volleyballers
İller Bankası volleyballers
Beşiktaş volleyballers
Karşıyaka volleyballers
Turkish expatriate volleyball players
Turkish expatriate sportspeople in Azerbaijan
Living people
21st-century Turkish sportswomen